Raymond Thomas (6 January 1931 – 1 May 2002) was a French shot putter, born in Paris, who competed in the 1956 Summer Olympics.

References

1931 births
2002 deaths
Athletes from Paris
Olympic athletes of France
Athletes (track and field) at the 1956 Summer Olympics
French male shot putters
Mediterranean Games gold medalists for France
Athletes (track and field) at the 1955 Mediterranean Games
Mediterranean Games medalists in athletics